The Manila Tagalog Film Festival, also known as the Manila Film Festival was a film festival organized in the city of Manila, Philippines. It is considered as the precursor to the Metro Manila Film Festival.

History
Then-Manila Mayor Antonio Villegas inaugurated the "Manila Film Festival" ("Manila Tagalog Film Festival"). The annual film festival ran for 10 days starting on the foundation day of Manila on June 24. During the run of the event, only Philippine films would be screened in theaters in Manila. It was set up in order to get Philippine films screened in "first-run" theaters which at that time only screened American films. Locally produced films prior to the film festival's first run was only screened at second-tier theaters.

The success of the Manila Film Festival would lead to the Philippine Motion Picture and Producers Association (PPMA) to start their own film festival in Manila as well as other cities in the Philippines such as Bacolod, Baguio, Cebu, Davao, and Iloilo. The PMPPA would later establish the successor film festival to the Manila Film Festival in 1975 through its President Joseph Estrada which would later be known as the "Metro Manila Film Festival". The Metro Manila Film Festival was set up with the approval of then-President and dictator Ferdinand Marcos.

References

1966 establishments in the Philippines
1975 disestablishments in the Philippines
Film festivals in the Philippines
Festivals in Metro Manila
Culture in Manila